Soquel Creek is a southward flowing  creek that begins in the Santa Cruz Mountains in Santa Cruz County, California and enters Monterey Bay at Capitola Beach in Capitola, California.

History and ecology
The redwood (Sequoia sempervirens) forests of the middle and upper watershed were heavily logged during the second half of the 1800s, and into the twentieth century. Most of today's forests are second growth, with most trees now over one hundred years old. 

Water quality of the creek is measured.

Watershed and course
Soquel Creek drains the largest watershed of mid-Santa Cruz County, and passes through the communities of Soquel and Capitola. Part of the creek's upper reaches flow through Soquel Demonstration State Forest and the western part of The Forest of Nisene Marks State Park. About 25% of the headwaters of the watershed are on land protected by the state.

See also
Rivers of California

References

Rivers of Santa Cruz County, California
Rivers of Northern California
Drainage basins of Monterey Bay